Clarks Mills is an unincorporated community located in the town of Cato, Manitowoc County, Wisconsin, United States. Clarks Mills is northeast of Valders.
The community revolves around St. Mary's Catholic Church and St. Mary-St. Michael Catholic School.

Notable people
Charles W. Sweeting, Wisconsin State Representative and businessman, lived in Clarks Mills; Sweeting managed several cheese factories.

Images

References

Unincorporated communities in Manitowoc County, Wisconsin
Unincorporated communities in Wisconsin